

Motihar Kuthi 
Motihar Kuthi is a colonial building situated at Rajshahi, within the Rajshahi University campus and close to its main gate. It is now used as the office BNCC of the university. In general appearance it is similar to the kuthis of Sardah so it was built in 1781 by Dutch East India Company.

History 
from 17th to 18th century kuthis were built as a residence or factory engaged in silk and indigo trade. In Rajshahi region alone more than 152 indigo kuthis were in operation with their headquarters at Sardah. Motihar kuthi is one of them. At a short distance there is another kuthi named kaajla. These two kuthis were at one time connected by the tributary river  connecting with the Ganges.

Exterior and interior 
Motihar kuthi is one storeyed building facing south, consists of six apartments. three east-west oriented halls behind the southern verandah and three more spacious apartments at the back.the central hall, which is about 4.5 high has a clerestory window above . the front verandahs are carried on four round simple columns each, whereas a set of triple columns have been used as the corners.the building has supporting on its north and west which appear to have been kitchen, warehouse which is now used as godowns of university

See also
 Motihar Thana
Boro Kuthi

References 

Rajshahi
Rajshahi District